Livingston Parish Public Schools (LPPS) is a school district headquartered in Livingston, Louisiana, United States with 42 schools, with approximately 25,500 students enrolled for the 2012 - 2013 school year.. The district's superintendent Bill Spear retired in early 2013.  John Watson was named his successor, but recently retired in 2016. Homer "Rick" Wentzel is now superintendent.  There are nine districts in the school system.  The Livingston Parish School system has been recognized for excelling in education in Louisiana.

The district serves all of Livingston Parish.

Schools
This is only a partial list of schools that Livingston Parish Public Schools operates.

K-12 schools
Zoned
 Holden High School   (Holden)
 Maurepas School  (Maurepas, Unincorporated area)
Special needs school
 Pine Ridge School  (Walker)

6-12 schools
 Livingston Parish Literacy & Technology Center (Walker)

9-12 schools
 Albany High School (Albany)
 Live Oak High School (Unincorporated area) (Watson)
 Springfield High School  (Springfield)

7-12 schools
 Doyle High School  (Livingston)
 French Settlement High School  (French Settlement)

10-12 schools

 Denham Springs High School  (Denham Springs)
 Walker High School  (Walker)

9th grade only schools
 Denham Springs Freshman High School  (Denham Springs)
 Walker Freshman High School (Walker)

PK-8 schools
 Frost School  (Unincorporated area) (Colyell, Louisiana)

4-8 schools
 Springfield Middle School  (Springfield)

6-8 schools
 Denham Springs Junior High School  (Denham Springs)
 Juban Parc Junior High School  (Denham Springs)
 Live Oak Middle School  (Unincorporated area) (Watson)
 North Corbin Junior High School]   (Walker, Louisiana)
 Southside Junior High School]  (Denham Springs, LA)
 Westside Junior High School  (Walker)

K-5 schools
 Denham Springs Elementary School  (Denham Springs)
 Eastside Elementary School  (Unincorporated area)
 Freshwater Elementary School  (Denham Springs)
 Gray's Creek Elementary School  (Unincorporated area)
 Live Oak Elementary School  (Unincorporated area)
Live Oak Elementary School used to be known as Live Oak Lower Elementary School.
 Levi Milton Elementary School  (Walker)
 North Corbin Elementary School  (Unincorporated area)
 North Live Oak Elementary School  (Unincorporated area)
 Northside Elementary School  (Denham Springs)
 Seventh Ward Elementary School  (Unincorporated area)
 South Live Oak Elementary  (Unincorporated area)
South Live Oak Elementary used to be known as Live Oak Upper Elementary School.
 South Walker Elementary School  (Walker)
 South Fork Elementary School  (Denham Springs)
 Southside Elementary School  (Denham Springs)
 Lewis Vincent Elementary School  (Unincorporated area)
 Walker Elementary School  (Walker)

3-4 schools
 Albany Upper Elementary School  (Albany)

K-4 schools
 Springfield Elementary School (Springfield)

PK-2 schools
 Albany Lower Elementary School (Albany)

5-8 schools
 Albany Middle School (Albany)

K-6 schools
 French Settlement Elementary School (French Settlement)

References

External links
Livingston Parish Public Schools. Official site.

School districts in Louisiana
Education in Livingston Parish, Louisiana